Luis Balagué Carreño (29 March 1944 – 18 February 2021) was a Spanish professional road bicycle racer.

Career
He was a professional between 1969 and 1977 and won stage 11 in the 1972 Vuelta a España.

Palmarès 

 1969
 1st, Stage 2a, Vuelta a los Valles Mineros
 1972
 1st, Stage 11, Vuelta a España, Zaragoza
 1976
 1st, Stage 1, Vuelta a los Valles Mineros

References

External links 
 

1944 births
2021 deaths
Sportspeople from Oviedo
Cyclists from Asturias
Spanish Vuelta a España stage winners
Spanish male cyclists